The Clube Desportivo da Huíla, in short Desportivo da Huíla, has a basketball club that regularly competes in the Angolan basketball major league aka BAI Basket. The club, based in Lubango, Huíla, is attached and sponsored by the local branch of the armed forces. Desportivo da Huila also has a privileged relationship with Angolan sports giant C.D. Primeiro de Agosto.

2009-10 roster

Updated as of 20 May 2010

See also
Desportivo da Huíla Football

References

Basketball teams in Angola
Sports clubs in Angola
1998 establishments in Angola
Basketball teams established in 1998